William Paisley Robson (20 December 1907 – 1985) was an English footballer who played in the Football League for Burnley  and Stoke City.

Career
Robson was born in Newcastle upon Tyne and played for Walker Celtic, Huddersfield Town and Washington Colliery. He then joined Stoke City after being recommended to Tom Mather by the club's north east scouts. His time at Stoke was mainly spent in the reserves making the odd first team appearance as and when required. In total he spent five years at the Victoria Ground making 14 appearances scoring 6 goals. He then spent the 1937–38 season with Burnley.

Career statistics

References

Footballers from Newcastle upon Tyne
English footballers
Association football forwards
Walker Celtic F.C. players
Huddersfield Town A.F.C. players
Stoke City F.C. players
Burnley F.C. players
English Football League players
Washington Colliery F.C. players
1907 births
1985 deaths